Sparta: War of Empires is a MMO strategy video game developed and published by Plarium. The game was released for web browser in 2014. The game is available free, with paid upgrades available.

Premise and gameplay
The game is set in 5th Century BCE Greece, during a war between Xerxes and the Persian Empire. Xerxes and his Persian Empire have set out to conquer Greece, leaving the lands of Hellas in a state of devastation.

In order to succeed in the game, players must take control of ancient warriors, master the weaponry of the era, and grow their resources gained through  fighting other players.

Each player becomes Archon of his or her city, and must build their city from scratch. Players need to protect their city-state with the help of King Leonidas and the Spartan army using a combination of diplomacy, strategy and war.

Music
The game features a fully scored soundtrack and sound composed and produced by BAFTA-winning composer Jesper Kyd. The track “Hellas” from the game is included on his 2015 album, Five Worlds of Plarium.

Critical reception

Sparta: War of Empires has received generally positive reviews, with Gamespresso editor-in-chief Alana Fearnall writing that "if the developers can support a large community base over time, Sparta: War of Empires is worth playing". Giovanni Damiano of Gamerbrain praises the game as "engaging, fun and exciting" but the game has been criticized for being costly for in game purchases.

References

External links
 

Video games set in Greece
Video games set in antiquity
2014 video games
Browser games
Fantasy video games
Massively multiplayer online real-time strategy games
Free-to-play video games
Video games scored by Jesper Kyd
Video games developed in Israel
Plarium games